Robert Jemison Jr. (September 17, 1802 – October 16, 1871) was an American politician, entrepreneur and slave owner who served as a Confederate States Senator from Alabama from 1863 to 1865. He also served in the two houses of the Alabama Legislature from 1837 until 1863.

Early years 
Jemison was born in Lincoln County, Georgia, near Augusta, Georgia, to William and Sarah (Mims) Jemison. He was educated there at Mount Zion Academy, where he was a classmate of Dixon Hall Lewis, and attended the University of Georgia. His father, William Jemison, was a slaveholder and landowner of at least four large-scale properties. Robert Jemison Jr. used the Jr. behind his name to distinguish himself from his grandfather, also named Robert. In 1826, Jemison moved with his father's family to Pickens County, Alabama, where he was a planter until 1836, when he moved to Tuscaloosa, Alabama.

Career 
Jemison served in the Alabama state legislature, initially in the Senate and then in the House, from 1840-1851. He returned to the Senate from 1851-1863. In 1861, he was a Delegate to the Convention and voted against the Ordinance of Secession. He was elected unanimously to be President of the Alabama Senate in 1863; soon after, he was elected to the Confederate States Senate, replacing William Lowndes Yancey, who had died of a kidney ailment.

Jemison owned multiple businesses. A primary source of capital was his plantations. His papers show that he owned 120 slaves in 1851, including 44 children under the age of 10. He owned six plantations in western Alabama, totaling . In 1858, he attempted to sell the plantations, 70 slaves and other land in Tuscaloosa, including another residence, a livery stable and the Indian Queen Hotel. Jemison's other ventures included a stagecoach line, toll roads, toll bridges, grist mills, sawmills, turnpikes, stables, a hotel, and plank roads. His largest enterprise was a  Cherokee Place plantation in what is now Northport, Alabama, where he lived before building the Jemison-Van de Graaff Mansion in Tuscaloosa.

Jemison advocated for the creation of a state-owned mental hospital which eventually became Bryce Hospital, and hired the same Philadelphia architectural firm to design both his private Tuscaloosa mansion and the hospital. After the Civil War, Jemison's wealth was significantly diminished, and eventually he lost his family mansion due to debt.

One of his businesses was the Tuscaloosa Bridge Company.  It built two of the first covered bridges across the Black Warrior River. Jemison hired Horace King, a skilled multiracial enslaved person from Russell County to build bridges in eastern Mississippi. King became one of the most respected bridge designers and builders in the Deep South. In 1846, Jemison, along with King's owner, John Godwin, obtained his freedom through an act of the Alabama Legislature, which exempted King from the manumission laws. King built the last covered bridge at Tuscaloosa and Northport over the Black Warrior in 1872 just a few months after Jemison's death on October 16, 1871. Jemison made an arrangement with Tuscaloosa County for King to build the bridge and this bridge was the first of many that the county would build.

Family 
Jemison was married to Priscilla (Cherokee) Jemison and had one daughter, Cherokee Mims Jemison.

References

External links 
 Confederate Congress bio
 Political Graveyard
 The Robert Jemison Jr. Papers, W.S. Hoole Special Collections Library, The University of Alabama.

1802 births
1871 deaths
19th-century American politicians
Alabama Secession Delegates of 1861
Alabama state senators
Confederate States of America senators
Members of the Alabama House of Representatives
People from Lincoln County, Georgia
People of Alabama in the American Civil War
American slave owners